Horsington is a village and Civil parish in Somerset, England, situated  south of Wincanton and  north of Templecombe in the South Somerset district.  The village lies on the edge of Horsington Marsh, part of the Blackmore Vale. In 2011 the population of the Parish, which includes the adjoining hamlets of Peckholdsash and Wilkin Throop and the village of South Cheriton was 571.

History

The name of the village means the settlement of the horse keepers.

The cross on the village green was erected in 1284 to mark the site of the market. It is built of hamstone with an octagonal shaft on a stepped circular base.

The parish was part of the hundred of Horethorne.

Horsington Manor was owned by the Gowens family from the 16th century until 1653, and from 1748 by Matthew Spencer who built the manor house. Spencer's son sold it to the Bailward family. Large quantities of documents relating to Horsington Manor have been donated to the Somerset Record Office for safe-keeping

In 1990s, Ardon Lyon, a philosophy professor from London, purchased Horsington House, in a state of substantial neglect, disrepair and deferred maintenance.  Prior to Professor Lyon's purchase, the owners had used Horsington House as a hotel.  Professor Lyon spent the better part of a decade repairing and restoring Horsington House and its out-buildings (such as the carriage house) to their original state.  He subdivided Horsington House, and the carriage house, into several flats and sold them to individual purchasers.

Horsington Village Hall, also known as St Margaret's Hall, was built in 1907, on land donated to the Community by Thomas Bailward.  It lies midway between Horsington and South Cheriton villages, isolated from other buildings but adjacent to playing fields leased to South Cheriton Football Club and Horsington Cricket Club.  There is a car-park for about 25 vehicles alongside

Governance

The parish council has responsibility for local issues, including setting an annual precept (local rate) to cover the council's operating costs and producing annual accounts for public scrutiny. The parish council evaluates local planning applications and works with the local police, district council officers, and neighbourhood watch groups on matters of crime, security, and traffic. The parish council's role also includes initiating projects for the maintenance and repair of parish facilities, as well as consulting with the district council on the maintenance, repair, and improvement of highways, drainage, footpaths, public transport, and street cleaning. Conservation matters (including trees and listed buildings) and environmental issues are also the responsibility of the council.

The village falls within the Non-metropolitan district of South Somerset, which was formed on 1 April 1974 under the Local Government Act 1972, having previously been part of Wincanton Rural District. The district council is responsible for local planning and building control, local roads, council housing, environmental health, markets and fairs, refuse collection and recycling, cemeteries and crematoria, leisure services, parks, and tourism.

Somerset County Council is responsible for running the largest and most expensive local services such as education, social services, libraries, main roads, public transport, policing and fire services, trading standards, waste disposal and strategic planning.

It is also part of the Somerton and Frome county constituency represented in the House of Commons of the Parliament of the United Kingdom. It elects one Member of Parliament (MP) by the first past the post system of election.

Religious sites

The parish Church of St John the Baptist was originally a 15th-century building, on the site of an earlier church, but was largely rebuilt in 1885–1887 by Willcox of Bath. The first recorded Rector was in 1305. It has been designated as a Grade II* listed building.

References

External links

 British History Online 'Horsington', A History of the County of Somerset: Volume 7: Bruton, Horethorne and Norton Ferris Hundreds (1999), pp. 119–31. Date accessed: 27 Oct 2005.
 Picture of Horsington House, a Barnardo's home from 1946 to 1972.
 The Horsington Blog -news, comment and gossip from Horsington & the Cheritons
 Horsington Village Hall
 Horsington Parish Council

Villages in South Somerset
Civil parishes in Somerset